Eustylini is a primarily Neotropical weevil tribe in the subfamily Entiminae.

Taxonomy 
The tribe Eustylini was named for the first time by Jean-Baptiste Henri Lacordaire in 1863, although, when first named, the tribe (Groupe Eustylides, p. 205) only contained three genera: Aptolemus (currently in Naupactini), Brachystylus, and Eustylus.

In 1986 the Eustylini contained most of its current genera, mostly due to revised taxonomic placements made by Guillermo Kuschel. The latest additions were made by Franz in 2012 by transferring former members of other tribes including Geonemini, Phyllobiini, and Tanymecini.

The type species of some genera (Compsus, Diaprepes, Eustylus, Exorides, and Exophthalmus) were redescribed by Franz. Most species of Eustylini are only known from their original descriptions.

Description 
A diagnosis for the tribe was offered by Girón 2020:

Distribution 
Eustylini ranges from south-western USA to Argentina, with its highest diversity in the Caribbean, Central America and northern South America.

Genera 
The tribe Eustylini currently includes 25 genera and 339 sdescribed species:

References

External links 

Entiminae